The Black Falcons is a representative rugby union team based in Adelaide, South Australia. The team is selected from the best senior club players in South Australia and represents the state in matches against other Australian representative teams. They currently play in the Emerging States Championship against Tasmania, Victoria Country and the Northern Territory. The Black Falcons previously competed in the Australian Rugby Shield run by the Australian Rugby Union.

History
The Black Falcons team traces its history back to the South Australian representative rugby union side that first played in 1933.

The seven-a-side South Australian Black Falcons team played at the Adelaide International Sevens tournament in the 1990s.

The name Adelaide Black Falcons was adopted for the team's entry into the Australian Rugby Shield competition in 2000. The Adelaide team  played in every Shield competition until the competition folded following the 2008 season. While the Black Falcons did not win any Shield titles, the team performed consistently well with a number of players making the annual Shield Merit Team as a result.

The Black Falcons regularly play invitational matches against other states, with the team being picked out of the top 2 divisions of the men's state league.

Notable past players
David Campese captained the Black Falcons at the Adelaide International Sevens tournament in 1998.

Kit
The Black Falcons wear a black, red and gold kit with the letters SA on the back in red representing South Australia.

The kit manufacturers were BLK until the 2017 season, and since then have been manufactured by O'Neills.

National Rugby Championship
From 2018 an additional competition was formed for teams from so-called "Minor States", called the NRC Division 2, featuring the Black Falcons, Victoria Country Barbarians, Northern Territory Mosquitoes and Tasmania Jack Jumpers. The first Competition was held in Adelaide (at the AA Bailey Reserve in Clarence Gardens) in September 2018, and the Black Falcons were the inaugural winners.

Current squad
The squad for the 2019 NRC II season:

Juniors
The Junior Falcons Under 20s team compete in the Southern States Championship against all the other Southern states  of Australia. The Under 18s Schoolboys team play in the National Schoolboy Division 2 Championships (Which they are the Champion of), while the Under 16s and Under 14s Falcons play in games against other Junior Representative Teams. The FalconsUnder 12s play in the Primary School Sports Australia National Championships.

Honours 
 2007 Darwin Hottest Sevens Buff Plate Champions
 2018 Emerging States Championship Champions

References

Rugby union teams in South Australia
Sporting clubs in Adelaide
Rugby clubs established in 1933
1933 establishments in Australia
Representative sports teams of South Australia